Peel Sessions was recorded by Australian folk rock group The Triffids for The John Peel Show on BBC Radio 1. The three tracks were first transmitted on 14 May 1985. The 12" EP of the recordings was not released until 1987. The EP was issued in a "Special Metallic Finish Limited Edition" sleeve.

Track listing 

 "Life of Crime"
 "Chicken Killer"
 "Lonely Stretch"

Personnel

The Triffids
Credited to:
 David McComb - vocals, guitar
 Robert McComb - guitar
 Graham Lee - steel guitar
 Alsy MacDonald - drums
 Martyn Casey - bass
 Jill Birt - keyboard

Additional musicians
 Fiona Franklyn - backing vocals
 Sally Collins - backing vocals

References 

1987 EPs
Peel Sessions recordings
Live EPs
1987 live albums
The Triffids EPs
The Triffids live albums